The 2009 Special Honours in New Zealand were announced in August 2009 as a result of the reinstatement of the appellations of "Sir" and "Dame" to the New Zealand Royal Honours System by passing Special Regulation 2009/90 Additional Statutes of The New Zealand Order of Merit, a legally binding regulation with the force of law in New Zealand.

The effect of the change was that individuals who had been appointed as Principal Companions or Distinguished Companions of the New Zealand Order of Merit were given the option of accepting titular honours: Principal Companions could opt to become Knights or Dames Grand Companion, and Distinguished Companions could become Knights or Dames Companion. Of the 85 living Principal and Distinguished Companions at the time, all but 13 accepted redesignation. Living widows of deceased male Principal or Distinguished Companions were eligible to be granted the courtesy title of "Lady".

The recipients are displayed as they were styled before the redesignation, and the date given in brackets is the date of the original appointment as a Principal or Distinguished Companion of the New Zealand Order of Merit.

New Zealand Order of Merit

Knight Grand Companion (GNZM)
The following Principal Companions were redesignated Knights Grand Companion:

 Professor Paul Terence Callaghan – of Wellington (31 December 2005).
 Emeritus Professor Lloyd George Geering  – of Wellington (30 December 2000).
 Sir Patrick Ledger Goodman  – of Motueka (3 June 2002).
 Professor Ralph Heberley Ngātata Love   – of Porirua (31 December 2008).
 His Excellency The Honourable Anand Satyanand  – governor-general of New Zealand (4 June 2006).

Dame Companion (DNZM)
The following Distinguished Companions were redesignated Dames Companion:
 (Isoleen) Heather Begg  – of Sydney, Australia (5 June 2000).
 Emeritus Professor Judith Mary Caroline Binney – of Auckland (31 December 2005).
 Dr Vera Doreen Blumhardt  – of Wellington (31 December 2002).
 Professor Margaret Clark   – of Wellington (30 December 2006).
 Christine McKelvie Cole Catley  – of North Shore (5 June 2006).
 Lynley Stuart Dodd – of Tauranga (31 December 2001).
 Dr Mary Josephine Drayton  – of Tauranga (31 December 2004).
 Jocelyn Barbara Fish  – of Hamilton (30 December 2000).
 Patricia Mary Harrison  – of Dunedin (4 June 2001).
 Grace Shellie Hollander  – of Christchurch (5 June 2000).
 Professor Linda Jane Holloway – of Dunedin (6 June 2005).
 Margaret Mary Millard  – of Palmerston North (30 December 2001).
 Deirdre Glenna Milne  – of Auckland (31 December 2003).
 Lois Joan Muir  – of Dunedin (7 June 2004).
 Dr Claudia Josepha Orange  – of Wellington (31 December 2008).
 Alison Burns Quentin-Baxter  – of Wellington (4 June 2007).
 Alison Mary Roxburgh  – of Nelson (2 June 2003).
 The Honourable Margaret Kerslake Shields  – of Pukerua Bay (31 December 2007).
 The Right Honourable Jennifer Mary Shipley – of Auckland (31 December 2002).
 Dr Margaret June Sparrow  – of Wellington (3 June 2002).
 Sukhinder Kaur Turner – of Wānaka (3 June 2002).
 Robin Adair White – of Masterton (2 June 2003).
 Gillian Karawe Whitehead – of Alexandra (2 June 2008).

Knight Companion (KNZM)
The following Distinguished Companions were redesignated Knights Companion:
 The Honourable Noel Crossley Anderson  – of Waitakere (7 June 2004).
 Professor Donald Ward Beaven  – of Christchurch (31 December 2004).
 The Right Honourable Peter Blanchard  – of Wellington (31 December 2004).
 Judge David James Carruthers – of Paraparaumu (6 June 2005).
 Russell Coutts  – of Valencia, Spain (5 June 2000).
 The Honourable Edward Taihakurei Junior Durie – of Lower Hutt (31 December 2007).
 Eion Sinclair Edgar – of Queenstown (2 June 2003).
 Air Marshal Bruce Reid Ferguson   – of Wellington (5 June 2006).
 George Vjeceslav Fistonich – of Auckland (6 June 2005).
 Dr Alan Russell Frampton – of Auckland (31 December 2004).
 Lieutenant-Colonel Harawira Tiri Gardiner – of Wellington (2 June 2008).
 David Rendel Kingston Gascoigne  – of Wellington (31 December 2005).
 The Right Honourable Thomas Munro Gault  – of Auckland (30 December 2000).
 Professor Peter David Gluckman – of Auckland (31 December 2007).
 John Packard Goulter  – of Paihia (31 December 2003).
 The Honourable John William Hansen – of Rangiora (2 June 2008).
 The Right Honourable John Steele Henry  – of Auckland (4 June 2001).
 Professor Vaughan Frederick Randal Jones – of Piedmont, California, United States of America (3 June 2002).
 The Honourable Douglas Lorimer Kidd – of Wellington (5 June 2000).
 Patrick Desmond Mahony – of Wellington (31 December 2003).
 Peter Charles Maire – of North Shore (2 June 2008).
 Professor Alan Francis Mark  – of Dunedin (30 December 2000).
 Emeritus Professor Arthur Harold Marshall – of Auckland (2 June 2008).
 Dr David Charles Mauger – of Auckland (3 June 2002).
 The Honourable John Joseph McGrath – of Wellington (30 December 2006).
 Dr Sidney Moko Mead – of Wellington (5 June 2006).
 Colin Earl Meads  – of Te Kūiti (30 December 2000).
 Ralph Norris – of Sydney, New South Wales, Australia (31 December 2005).
 Noel Stuart Robinson – of Auckland (5 June 2006).
 Peter Graham Siddell  – of Auckland (31 December 2007).
 Professor David Christopher Graham Skegg  – of Dunedin (31 December 2008).
 Bruce Houlton Slane  – of Auckland (31 December 2002).
 Dr Peter George Snell  – of Dallas, Texas, United States of America (31 December 2001).
 Kenneth Allen Stevens – of Auckland (31 December 2007).
 Archie John Te Atawhai Taiaroa – of Taumarunui (2 June 2003).
 Tumu (George Michael) Te Heuheu – of Taupō (31 December 2004).
 The Right Honourable Edmund Walter Thomas  – of Auckland (31 December 2001).
 Stephen Robert Tindall – of North Shore (4 June 2007).
 The Right Honourable Andrew Patrick Charles Tipping – of Wellington (31 December 2005).
 Peter John Trapski  – of Tauranga (31 December 2002).
 Henry William van der Heyden – of Putāruru (4 June 2007).
 John Wells – of Auckland (31 December 2008).
 Tennant Edward (Tay) Wilson  – of Lower Hutt (30 December 2006).
 The Honourable William Gillow Gibbes Austen Young  – of Christchurch (4 June 2007).

Widows of Principal and Distinguished Companions
The following surviving spouses of deceased Principal and Distinguished Companions were granted the use of the courtesy title of "Lady":
 Olive Doreen Hutchins – of Queenstown (spouse of the late Leslie Hutchins  ).
 Elaine Ivy James – of Hamilton (spouse of the late Oswald George James ).
 Doris Parekohe Vercoe  – of Rotorua (spouse of the late Right Reverend Te Whakahuihui Vercoe  ).

References

New Zealand Royal Honours System
2009 in New Zealand
Hon
2009 awards